Events in the year 1917 in Brazil.

Incumbents

Federal government 
 President: Venceslau Brás 
 Vice President: Urbano Santos da Costa Araújo

Governors 
 Alagoas: João Batista Accioli Jr. 
 Amazonas: Pedro de Alcântara Bacelar
 Bahia: Antônio Ferrão Muniz de Aragão
 Ceará: João Tomé de Sabóia e Silva
 Goiás:
 until 9 May: Aprígio José de Sousa
 9 May - 14 July: Salatiel Simões de Lima
 from 14 July: João Alves de Castro
 Maranhão:
 until 20 March: Herculano Nina Parga
 from 20 March Antônio Brício de Araújo
 Mato Grosso: Caetano Manuel de Faria e Albuquerque, then Camilo Soares de Moura, then Cipriano da Costa Ferreira
 Minas Gerais: Delfim Moreira
 Pará: 
 until 1 February: Enéas Martins
 from 1 February: Lauro Sodré
 Paraíba: Francisco Camilo de Holanda
 Paraná: Afonso Camargo
 Pernambuco: Manuel Antônio Pereira Borba
 Piauí: Eurípedes Clementino de Aguiar
 Rio Grande do Norte: Joaquim Ferreira Chaves
 Rio Grande do Sul: Antônio Augusto Borges de Medeiros
 Santa Catarina:
 São Paulo: 
 Sergipe:

Vice governors 
 Rio Grande do Norte:
 São Paulo:

Events 
5 April - The steamship Paraná, loaded with coffee and travelling in accordance with the demands made on neutral countries, is torpedoed by a German submarine; three Brazilians are killed.
11 April - Brazil breaks off diplomatic relations with Germany.
7 May - Foreign Minister Lauro Müller is obliged to resign because of his German origins.
20 May - the ship Tijuca is torpedoed near the French coast by a German submarine. 
27 July - The steamer Lapa Brazil is hit by three torpedoes from a German submarine.
23 October - The Brazilian freighter Macau, one of the vessels seized in the course of the war, was torpedoed by the German submarine SM U-93 near the coast of Spain, and the captain taken prisoner.
26 October - World War I: Brazil declares war on the Central Powers.
1 November -  A mob damages German property in Petropolis, including the restaurant Brahma (completely destroyed), the Gesellschaft Germania, the German school, the company Arp, and the German Journal.
4 November - Acari Guaíba and another ship are torpedoed by the same German submarine, SM U-151.

Births 
9 January - Otto Glória, football coach (died 1986)
25 January - Jânio Quadros, 22nd President of Brazil (died 1992)
21 February - Luz del Fuego, ballerina, naturist and feminist (as Dora Vivacqua; died 1967) 
17 April - Roberto de Oliveira Campos, economist, writer and politician (died 2001)
5 May - Dalva de Oliveira, singer (died 1972)
31 May - Zilka Salaberry, actress (died 2005)
2 September - Laurindo Almeida, guitarist and composer (died 1995)
30 September - Chacrinha, comedian, radio and TV personality (died 1988)

Deaths 
11 February - Oswaldo Cruz, physician, pioneer bacteriologist, epidemiologist and public health officer (born 1872)
22 October - Manuel Lopes Rodrigues, artist (born 1860)

References

See also 
1917 in Brazilian football

 
1910s in Brazil
Years of the 20th century in Brazil
Brazil
Brazil